Disguise is the fifth studio album by American metalcore band Motionless in White. It was released on June 7, 2019, through Roadrunner Records and was produced by Drew Fulk and Chris "Motionless" Cerulli. It is the second release on a major label since the band's departure from Fearless Records. The album's tracklist was revealed on April 17 together with the release of the two singles, "Disguise", which had been premiered at Earthday Birthday in Orlando a few days prior, and "Brand New Numb". It is the band's first album with Vinny Mauro on drums and former Ice Nine Kills guitarist Justin Morrow (although credited, neither of them perform on the album), who replaced Devin "Ghost" Sola on bass guitar, as well as the first album not to feature Josh Balz on keyboards.

Background and promotion
On May 6, 2018, Chris Motionless announced via Instagram that a new album would be released in 2019. He claimed that he, along with Ryan Sitkowski and Ricky Olson, would begin full-time writing prior to touring with Warped Tour that summer.

On April 17, the band announced the album was to be titled Disguise. On the same day, they released two singles off of the album titled "Disguise" and "Brand New Numb", along with the tracklist and official artwork created by Zach Dunn.

On May 10, the band released their third single "Undead Ahead 2: The Tale of the Midnight Ride" and its corresponding music video.

On June 5, two days before the album was due to drop, the band premiered the song "Thoughts & Prayers" on BBC's Radio 1's Rock Show with Daniel P. Carter.

Critical reception

Disguise received mixed reviews from several music critics. Ian Kenworthy of Already Heard gave the album 3.5 out of 5 and said: "At its best, Disguise delivers a fun bucketload of goth-flavoured metalcore mayhem. However, it sags in places, especially when they step outside their comfort zone." Carlos Zelaya of Dead Press! scored the album 4/10 stating: "For their fifth album, Disguise, you pretty much know what to expect at this point, with the album being rife with the band's signature goth and industrial-tinged metal, with some clear toe-dipping into nu-metal here and there too."

Distorted Sound scored the album 7 out of 10 and said: "In all, MOTIONLESS IN WHITE have sculpted an album that will surely continue to contribute to their domination, but it does feel as though it achieves this at the expense of innovation and more forward thinking ideology. They are a band that have achieved a lot despite their hardship, and their well earned confidence shines through Disguise at every opportunity." Adam Rice of Wall of Sound rated the album 3.5 out of 5 saying, "Motionless In White have done it again, although not all songs are great there is a healthy mix of different styles and genres which would tailor to anyone's music tastes. With not one song sounding similar to another, its a bag of all sorts!"

Loudwire named it one of the 50 best metal albums of 2019.

Track listing

Personnel
Credits retrieved from AllMusic. 

Motionless in White
 Chris "Motionless" Cerulli – lead vocals, additional guitar, production, composition
 Ryan Sitkowski – lead guitar, bass, backing vocals on "Thoughts & Prayers"
 Ricky "Horror" Olson – rhythm guitar, bass, backing vocals, co-lead vocals on "Undead Ahead 2: The Tale of the Midnight Ride"
 Vinny Mauro – drums 
 Justin Morrow – bass, backing vocals 

Additional musicians
 Tom Hane – drums, engineering, composition

Additional personnel
 Drew Fulk – production, mixing, composition
 Jeff Dunne – engineering
 Justin DeBlieck – vocal engineering, editing
 Johnny Andrews and Gaiapatra – composition
 Dave Rath – A&R
 Kim Schon – management
 Zach Dunn – cover art
 Sean Smith – design, layout
 Lindsay Adler – photography

Charts

References

2019 albums
Motionless in White albums
Roadrunner Records albums